Heinrich Gustav Bassermann (12 July 1849 – 30 August 1909) was a German Lutheran theologian born in Frankfurt am Main.

From 1868 to 1873 he was a student at the universities of Jena, Zurich and Heidelberg. At Jena he was a pupil of Karl August Hase (1800–1890), and in Heidelberg he studied under Heinrich Julius Holtzmann (1832–1910). During this time period he also served with a dragoon unit in the Franco-Prussian War (1870–71).

In 1873–76 he was an assistant pastor in Arolsen, and later worked as a lecturer of New Testament exegesis at the University of Jena. Soon afterwards he was appointed an associate professor of practical theology at Heidelberg, where in 1880 he became a full professor and a university preacher.

Bassermann was co-founder of the Allgemeinen evangelisch-protestantischen Missionsvereins, and from 1879 was editor of the "Zeitschrift für praktische Theologie" in collaboration with Rudolf Ehlers (1834–1908). He died in Samaden, Switzerland on 30 August 1909.

Selected publications 
 Dreissig christliche Predigten (Thirty Christian sermons), 1875. 
 Handbuch der geistlichen Beredsamkeit (Textbook of spiritual eloquence), 1885.
 Akademische Predigten (Academic sermons), 1886.
 System der Liturgik (System of liturgics), 1889.
 Geschichte der badischen Gottesdienstordnung (History of the Baden order of worship), 1891.
 Sine ira et studio, 1894.
 Der badische Katechismus erklärt (The Baden Catechism explained), 1896–97.
 Richard Rothe als praktischer Theologe (Richard Rothe as practical theologian), 1899.
 Zur Frage des Unionskatechismus (On the question of Union Catechism), 1901.
 Ueber Reform des Abendmahls (Regarding reform of the Eucharist), 1904.
 Wie studiert man evangelische Theologie? (How does one study evangelical theology?), 1905.
 Gott: Fünf Predigten (God: five sermons), 1905.

References 
 New Schaff-Herzog Encyclopedia of Religious Knowledge
  English translation

External links
 

German Lutheran theologians
19th-century German Protestant theologians
Clergy from Frankfurt
Academic staff of Heidelberg University
Heidelberg University alumni
University of Zurich alumni
University of Jena alumni
1849 births
1909 deaths
19th-century German male writers
19th-century German writers
German male non-fiction writers
19th-century Lutherans